Calvin K.Y. Say (born February 1, 1952) is an American politician and former Speaker of the Hawaii House of Representatives. Say currently serves as a member of the Honolulu City Council, representing Honolulu's 5th District. He was sworn in as a member of the council in January 2021, taking the seat formerly occupied by Ann Kobayashi, who retired due to the council's term limits. After being worn in, Say was appointed chairperson of the council's budget committee.

Prior to his election to the City Council, Say was a Democratic member of the Hawaii State House of Representatives, representing the 20th District from 1976 to 2020. He served as Speaker of the House for 13 years until 2013, when he was replaced by Joseph M. Souki (who was himself a former Speaker). He attended Saint Louis High School and received a bachelor's degree in education from the University of Hawaii at Manoa.

References

External links
Hawaii House of Representatives - Calvin K.Y. Say official government website
Project Vote Smart - Representative Calvin K.Y. Say (HI) profile
Follow the Money - Calvin K Y Say
2006 2004 2002 2000 1998 campaign contributions

Democratic Party members of the Hawaii House of Representatives
1952 births
Living people
University of Hawaiʻi alumni
People from Honolulu
21st-century American politicians
Hawaii politicians of Chinese descent